Yahya III ibn al-Qasim was an Idrisid ruler of Morocco.

Life 
Yahya was the son of al-Qasim, a younger son of the second Idrisid ruler of Morocco, Idris II. The family of al-Qasim controlled northern Morocco, with the cities of Tangier, Basra and Ceuta, and for a time in the 860s even the western half of the Idrisid capital, Fes.

Known by the sobriquet al-Miqdam, Yahya was called upon for assistance by the inhabitants of the Qaraqiyyin quarter of Fes when the town was occupied by the Kharijite rebel Abd al-Razzaq. Yahya drove the rebels away, and is traditionally accounted as the eighth Idrisid emir, until his death in 905. 

Modern historians on the other hand consider that his rule over Fes is unlikely to have lasted long: his uncle, Dawud, appears to have ruled the city in 877, while numismatic evidence shows that between 880 and 893 the capital was ruled by members of a different branch of the Idrisid dynasty, descending from another uncle, Isa. 

Yahya fell in battle in 905 against the forces of a cousin from a different branch of the dynasty, Yahya IV.

Genealogy

References

Sources
 
 

Idrisid emirs
9th-century Arabs
10th-century Arabs
People from Fez, Morocco
905 deaths
9th-century monarchs in Africa
10th-century monarchs in Africa
Moroccan people of Arab descent
9th-century Moroccan people
10th-century Moroccan people
Year of birth unknown
Monarchs killed in action